The 1994 British National Track Championships were a series of track cycling competitions held from 24–30 July 1994 at the Leicester Velodrome. The Championships were organised by the British Cycling Federation.

It would be the last championships held at the Leicester Velodrome because a new National Cycling Centre in Manchester which included the Manchester Velodrome had been opened by Princess Anne on 14 September 1994. British Cycling would also move their headquarters to the National Cycling Centre, Manchester, in November 1994.

Medal summary

Men's Events

Women's Events

References

National Track Championships
National Track Championships